New Texas Giant is a steel roller coaster located at Six Flags Over Texas in Arlington, Texas. It originally opened as Texas Giant, which was the tallest wooden roller coaster in the world when it debuted in 1990. Manufactured by Dinn Corporation and designed by Curtis D. Summers, Texas Giant operated for nearly two decades and was ranked in Amusement Today magazine's annual Golden Ticket Awards as the best roller coaster in 1998 and 1999. The ride's popularity declined as it gained a negative reputation for its increasing roughness.

Texas Giant closed in 2009 and underwent an 18-month refurbishment by Rocky Mountain Construction (RMC). It reemerged as New Texas Giant in 2011. Much of the original wooden structure was kept, but the wooden track was replaced with steel using RMC's I-Box track technology. New Texas Giant also features multiple banked turns up to an angle of 115°.

The renovated coaster was well-received, winning Best New Ride in the 2011 Golden Ticket Awards and ranking highly in industry polls. A fatal incident that occurred on July 19, 2013, resulted in modifications to the ride's restraint system.

History
In September 1989, Six Flags announced the hiring of Dinn Corporation to build two new wooden roller coasters, with Curtis D. Summers as the designer. One would go to Six Flags Over Texas as The Texas Giant and the other would go to Six Flags Over Georgia as Georgia Cyclone.

Construction had already started in June 1989. The trains were manufactured by Philadelphia Toboggan Coasters. The Texas Giant officially opened on March 17, 1990.

Following the ride's opening it had several modifications and renovations, which included reprofiling parts of the ride, shortening the seven-car trains to six-car trains, and performing maintenance on the wooden track. Although the maintenance did improve the ride, park officials needed a more permanent solution. Initial speculation indicated the ride would be removed entirely from the park; however, Six Flags Over Texas denied any intention or consideration to do so. In March 2009, the park announced the closure of Texas Giant prior to a $10 million renovation. Following Fright Fest for that year, the ride closed on November 1, 2009.

Renovations began almost immediately and involved the removal of all of the wooden track and modifications to some of the support structure. On March 3, 2010, Six Flags Over Texas and Rocky Mountain Construction (RMC) unveiled the steel I-Box track which would be used on the refurbished ride. The track was developed over the course of three years by RMC owner Fred Grubb, and Ride Centerline, LLC engineers Alan Schilke and Dody Bachtar. The steel track was designed to be a replacement for any existing wooden track structure, with the rail shape, approximate weight, and dimensions remaining the same. Schilke designed the modifications to the layout, giving specifications to Grubb for manufacturing at RMC's Idaho plant. There, two-dimensional plates of steel were machine-welded to form the three-dimensional track parts. In October 2010, Six Flags announced that the renovated ride would be called the New Texas Giant. It opened on April 22, 2011.

Characteristics

As the name suggests, New Texas Giant is located within the Texas section of Six Flags Over Texas. It was Rocky Mountain Construction's first installation of I-Box track. New Texas Giant operates with three trains manufactured by Gerstlauer. There are three trains (colored red, blue, and black) themed to 1961 Cadillac Devilles. Each train is made up of six cars, each seating riders in two rows of two. Riders are restrained through the use of an individual hydraulic lap bar and a seat belt.

The original Texas Giant by Dinn Corporation was  lower in height than its Rocky Mountain Construction counterpart. The refurbished New Texas Giant features a steeper and longer first drop, and therefore achieves a faster maximum speed.

Ride experience

The New Texas Giant begins with a right turn out of the station. This leads directly to a  chain lift hill. Once at the top, riders drop  at an angle of 79°. A double up leads into a 90° overbanked turn, a dip and a 95° overbanked turn. Another dip and rise leads the train into a 115° overbanked turn. The exit from the overbanked turn leads into a small air-time hill, which delivers the greatest negative g-force on the ride, before ascending up into the mid-course brake run. The train drops from the brake run and continues through a series of low-to-the-ground air-time hills and directional changes. This runs through three separate tunnels, finishing with the final brake run and short path back to the station.

Reception
The original Texas Giant was well received, though its popularity had declined towards the end of its operation. Following its 2010 renovation, the ride's popularity returned.

In Amusement Today's Golden Ticket Awards Texas Giant ranked as the number one wooden roller coaster for 1998 and 1999. Its ranking slowly declined to position 32 in 2009, its final year of operation as a wooden roller coaster. Following its 2010 renovation, the New Texas Giant again ranked highly in the Golden Ticket Awards (this time amongst steel roller coasters), achieving ranks of 6 and 5 in 2011 and 2012, respectively. The ride also won a Golden Ticket Award for being the Best New Ride of 2011.

Incidents
On July 19, 2013, a 52-year-old woman fell to her death while riding New Texas Giant. The ride was closed indefinitely pending further investigation. The park completed its investigation stating on September 10, 2013, that mechanical failure was not to blame. The ride reopened on September 14, 2013, after redesigned restraint bars, pads, and seat belts were installed on all three trains. The incident resulted in the introduction of seat belts as a precaution on other roller coasters throughout the Six Flags chain.

References

External links

New Texas Giant at Rocky Mountain Construction

Roller coasters in Texas
Hybrid roller coasters
Roller coasters manufactured by Dinn Corporation
Roller coasters manufactured by Rocky Mountain Construction
Roller coasters operated by Six Flags
Six Flags Over Texas
Texas culture
Wooden roller coasters
Best New Ride winners